Maiestas canga is a species of insect from the Cicadellidae family that can be found in Liberia and Congo. Originally placed in Recilia, it was later placed within Maiestas when Recilia was revised down to only contain two species in 2009.

References

External links

Insects described in 1962
Insects of Africa
Maiestas